Acridoxena is a monotypic genus of bush crickets (also known as katydids). It is now placed in the tribe Acridoxenini of the subfamily Mecopodinae; previously it was in the subfamily Acridoxeninae. It has one species, Acridoxena hewaniana, found in western central Africa.

References

Mecopodinae
Tettigoniidae genera
Monotypic Orthoptera genera